A tourist trap is an establishment made for attracting tourists.

Tourist trap may also refer to:
 Tourist Trap (film), a 1979 horror film directed by David Schmoeller
 Tourist Trap (1998 film), a 1998 comedy film directed by Richard Benjamin
Tourist Trap, a 2004 children's novel by Charles Ogden
 "Tourist Trap" (Ben 10 episode), an episode of the TV series Ben 10
Tourist Trap (TV series), a 2018-19 comedy series broadcast on BBC One Wales